Thompson Peak is located in the McDowell Mountains, the summit being  to the northeast of Phoenix, Arizona. Thompson Peak has amateur and Maricopa County government radio towers on the summit, accessible via a service road from Fountain Hills.

References

External links
 "Thompson Peak - MSP, AZ". HikeArizona.com.
 

Landforms of Maricopa County, Arizona
Mountains of Arizona
Mountains of Maricopa County, Arizona